Sivan Ya’ari (born June 23, 1978) is an Israeli social entrepreneur who founded Innovation: Africa and serves as its Founder & CEO.

Early life and education 
Ya'ari was born in Israel, raised in France and educated in the United States. She received a bachelor's degree in finance from Pace University and a master's degree in international Energy management and policy from Columbia University.

Innovation: Africa 
In 2008, Ya’ari founded Innovation: Africa a nonprofit organization that brings innovative Israeli solar, water and agricultural technologies to rural villages throughout Africa. The organization has completed over 880 projects in remote villages,  providing electricity and clean water to more than 4 million people across 10 African countries. 

 
Innovation: Africa maintains headquarters in both New York and Herzliya Pituah.

Recognition 
Sivan and her organization, Innovation: Africa, have received multiple awards for their work. 

Since 2012, Innovation: Africa has had a special consultative status to the United Nations Economic and Social Council (ECOSOC). Thanks to Innovation: Africa’s transparent and live monitoring of its projects, it was granted the United Nations Innovation Award.

Ya’ari received the "Light of Israel Award" from the Israeli Ministry of Foreign Affairs and has been recognized as one of the most "Inspiring Israeli this Decade" by Grapevine; one of the “50 Most Influential Women in Israel” by Forbes; one of the "Top 10 Most Influential Israelis in International Business, science, and Culture” by NoCamels and one of the “Top 100 People Positively Influencing Jewish Life” by Algemeiner Journal;

Personal life 
Ya’ari resides in Herzliya  with her husband David Ya’ari (Borowich) and their three children.

References 

People from Tel Aviv
1978 births
Living people